Habronattus icenoglei is a species of jumping spider (family Salticidae). It is found in the southwestern United States and north-central Mexico.

References

Further reading

External links

 

Salticidae
Articles created by Qbugbot
Spiders described in 1979